Kempton is a census-designated place in Albany Township, Berks County, Pennsylvania.

Demographics

Description
Kempton is located at 40.625°N, 75.853°W at the junction of PA Route 737 and Kistler Valley Road. The community is approximately six miles north of the borough of Lenhartsville. As of the 2010 census, the population was 169 residents.

The Kempton Country Fair is held annually in Kempton in June, which features farm animals, farm tools, and vehicles. Tourist attractions in the Kempton area include the Hawk Mountain Sanctuary, WK&S Railroad, Appalachian Trail, Kempton Hotel, and Kempton Community Center. The Community Center hosts the Pennsylvania Renewable Energy Festival annually during the fall.

Popular culture
A postcard of Kempton is featured in the opening introduction of the 1983 film, National Lampoon's Vacation.

References

External links

Census-designated places in Berks County, Pennsylvania
Census-designated places in Pennsylvania